A screw is an externally threaded fastener. "Screw" or "screws" may also refer to:

Engineering and mathematics
Devices with a helical thread:
 Screw (simple machine)
Screw thread, screw thread principles and standards
 Archimedes' screw, a simple machine for transporting water to a higher elevation
Leadscrew, a type of screw used to provide controlled and quantifiable movement in machine tools
 Screw (motion), a description of spiral motion used in rigid body dynamics
 Screw propeller
 Screw, some specific pair of vectors (e.g., force+moment or linear+angular velocity); see Screw theory
 Screw axis, the axis of rotation in 3D geometry

People with the name
Homer Screws (born 1966), American soccer defender
Kattie B. Screws (born 1930), matriarch of the Jackson family of American singers
William W. Screws (1839–1913), American politician in Alabama

Arts, entertainment, and media

Music
 Screw (band), a Japanese rock band
 "Screw" (song), a 2009 song by Japanese singer Kotoko
 A Screw, an EP by Swans
 Chopped and screwed music, a technique of remixing hip hop music by slowing the tempo
 "(Let's Dance) The Screw", a 1963 song by The Crystals

Other uses in arts, entertainment, and media
 Screw (card game)
 Screw (magazine), a pornographic tabloid published and edited by Al Goldstein
 Screw (TV series), a 2022 British comedy-drama series from Channel 4.

Other
 Screws v. United States, 1945 US Supreme Court case

See also
 Screwed (disambiguation)
 Thumbscrew (disambiguation)